The Mechanised Infantry Regiment is an infantry regiment of the Indian Army, comprising 27 battalions dispersed under various armoured formations throughout India. Together with the 21 battalions of Brigade of the Guards, they form part of the Mechanised Infantry arm, which along with the Armoured Corps form the Mechanised Forces.

History
The Mechanised Infantry Regiment is one of the youngest regiments in the army and was the mastermind of General K Sundarji, who had the foresight to cater to the needs of a modern army. After the Indo-Pakistani War of 1965, a need was felt to give infantry battalions greater mobility, especially when operating with armoured formations. In 1969, 1st Madras became the first infantry unit to be equipped with the armoured personnel carrier (APC) TOPAS. In 1970, nine more of the oldest battalions from various infantry regiments were equipped with APCs, these included TOPAS, SKOT and BTR-60.  These battalions remained affiliated with their erstwhile Infantry Regiments and Regimental Centres and did not form a separate regiment. Eventually, fourteen old infantry battalions were mechanised.

During the Indo-Pakistani War of 1971, some of these battalions saw action as part of combat groupings with armoured units for the first time.
The APCs were replaced with BMP-1 Infantry Combat Vehicles between 1977 and 1978. The need for something more concrete and viable was felt, along with a need to develop a common battle and training philosophy with regards to the type of tactics. This necessitated the raising a totally new arm in the Indian Army, resulting in the various mechanised battalions being brought together under a single cap badge as the Mechanised Infantry Regiment, which was raised with fourteen battalions on 2 April 1979 and the affairs of the regiment were transferred from Directorate General of Infantry to Armoured Corps Directorate, which was renamed the Directorate General Mechanised Forces in  1986. Gen K Sundarji was appointed the first Colonel of the Mechanised Infantry Regiment, the post he held till his retirement.

The regiment saw a rapid expansion in the 1980s. Mechanised infantry battalions numbered 15 to 26 have been raised on all-India mixed class composition, unlike the older units, which were single class ones. The only exception was 20 Rajput, which joined the regiment as the 24th battalion in April 1992.
The Mechanised Infantry Regiment has been involved in Operation Pawan in Sri Lanka, Operation Rakshak in Punjab and Jammu & Kashmir and Operation Vijay in Jammu & Kashmir. It also took part in UN Peacekeeping Operations in Somalia, Congo, Angola and Sierra Leone.The Regiment is affiliated to the Indian Naval Ship Gharial.

MIRC Institutions

Mechanised Infantry Regimental Centre
The Mechanised Infantry Regimental Centre was established in 1979 at Ahmednagar and it spread over 2000 acres. It trains approximately 950 recruits annually. It has three training battalions: Infantry Training Battalion, Composite Training Battalion and Driving and Maintenance Battalion.

Quarter Guard
The Quarter Guard of the MIRC was created on 9 August 1979 during the first biennial conference. After the sanction of KLP, the present Quarter Guard was conceptualised in half circular area with front wide platform. The new Quarter Guard was completed in 1986. The Quarter Guard has 18 internal rooms as well as an armour shop and a guard room. To the right and left side of the guard are two guns and two cannons that symbolise the strength of soldiers.

Military Band

The MIRC Band is based at Ahmednagar and serves all regimental duties related to musical support. The band was formed during April 1982 under the auspices of Brigadier Tilak Raj. The band has held the honour of performing at national events such as the Beating Retreat, Army and Republic Day Parades, as well as events at the Rashtrapati Bhavan. It also has performed at the 2007 Military World Games, the 2010 Commonwealth Games, and the 2001 Mumbai International Fleet Review among others.

Regimental museum
The MIRC Museum was founded and inaugurated on 9 February 2000 by Lieutenant General Pankaj Joshi, the then Colonel of the regiment. The museum is currently housed at the ground floor of Mechanised Bhavan. The museum houses the regimental colour, as well as the history if the MIRC and mementos from Colonels of the regiment.

Equipment
 BMP-1 Infantry Fighting Vehicles
 BMP-2 Infantry Fighting Vehicles
 BTR-60 and BTR-70 Armoured Personnel Carriers
 TATA Kestrel

Battalions of the Mechanised Infantry Regiment

The regiment consists of the following battalions -

External Media
 Indian Army Mechanised Infantry describing the weapons, vehicle and soldiers
 Images of the Mechanised Infantry showing the combat vehicles.

Notes

References

Infantry regiments of the Indian Army from 1947
Military units and formations established in 1979